Ronald A. Lindsay was president and CEO of the Center for Inquiry and of its affiliates, the Council for Secular Humanism and the Committee for Skeptical Inquiry. He held this position June 2008 – 2016.

Philosophical work

Lindsay has a PhD in philosophy from Georgetown University, with a concentration in bioethics. He is the author of the book Future Bioethics: Overcoming, Taboos, Myths, and Dogmas (Prometheus: 2008). The book was favorably reviewed by the journal Nature, which described it as “reasoned, readable, and accessible.”  In the book Lindsay argues for, among other things, legalization of assisted suicide and a removal of restrictions on embryonic stem cell research. He has published a number of articles in peer-reviewed journals, including the Kennedy Institute of Ethics Journal and the American Journal of Bioethics. These articles, like his book, focus on topics in bioethics, including the morality of assisted suicide and human enhancement technology. Lindsay also wrote the essay on Euthanasia for the International Encyclopedia of Ethics (Wiley-Blackwell: 2013).

Lindsay has also written several articles on ethical issues for Free Inquiry, the publication of the Council for Secular Humanism. These articles include a vigorous defense of equal rights for LGBT individuals, and a discussion of the foundation for a nonreligious ethics.

Lindsay’s latest book is The Necessity of Secularism: Why God Can’t Tell Us What to Do (Pitchstone 2014). In this book, Lindsay argues that for democratic discourse to be successful, religious doctrines need to be kept out of public policy discussions, since these doctrines are meaningful only to members of particular religions.

Legal career

In addition to his PhD in philosophy, Lindsay has a law degree from the University of Virginia. Before joining the Center for Inquiry, he practiced law for twenty-six years with the law firm of Seyfarth Shaw LLP. He concentrated in employment law and his appellate cases indicate he represented employers.

Lindsay, however, also represented clients pro bono in church-state matters, which is where he made his acquaintance with atheist and humanist leaders. He represented the well-known atheist Madalyn Murray O'Hair in a lawsuit challenging the constitutionality of chaplains in Congress. Although O’Hair initially received a favorable decision from the U.S. Court of Appeals for the District of Columbia Circuit, her case was later mooted by the Supreme Court decision in Marsh v. Chambers.

Lindsay subsequently represented humanist leader, and founder of the Center for Inquiry, Paul Kurtz in a lawsuit, Kurtz v. Baker, that challenged certain aspects of Congress’s practice of having official chaplains that had not been addressed by the decision in Marsh v. Chambers. Specifically, Kurtz argued that the Senate chaplain used his government-funded opening prayers to attack nontheists. Kurtz also challenged the chaplains’ refusal to allow him to open a Senate or a House session as a “guest” who would deliver solemn, nonreligious remarks. The federal district court judge who reviewed the prayers was troubled by the Senate chaplain’s remarks. This claim was resolved when the Senate chaplain wrote an apology to Kurtz and pledged to refrain from disparaging nonbelievers. The second claim was ultimately dismissed on appeal with the appellate court finding that Kurtz lacked standing.

Lindsay also submitted amicus briefs on behalf of the Center for Inquiry or the Council for Secular Humanism in various Supreme Court cases, such as the Ten Commandments case, McCreary County v. ACLU.

Lindsay's tenure at the Center for Inquiry

In March, 2011, the Center for Inquiry launched an advertising campaign in various cities, with billboards and subway ads proclaiming "You don't need God–to hope, to care, to love, to live." The campaign received significant media attention. A second phase of the campaign was launched in the fall of 2011 based on donor support for the campaign.

In August, 2011, the Center for Inquiry and its affiliate, the Committee for Skeptical Inquiry, submitted petitions to the Food and Drug Administration, authored by Lindsay and Barry Karr, Executive Director of the Committee for Skeptical Inquiry. The petitions requested the agency to require homeopathic drugs to be tested for efficacy.

Along with the leaders of other secular organizations, Lindsay spoke at the Reason Rally, held on the National Mall in Washington, D.C. on March 24, 2012.

In 2014, the Center for Inquiry launched a web-based campaign to “Keep Health Care Safe and Secular,” focusing on reproductive rights, the dangers in alternative medicine, and the importance of vaccination.

Also in 2014, the Center for Inquiry prevailed in an appellate court case in which it sought equal rights for nonbelievers. The United States Court of Appeals for the Seventh Circuit ruled in Center for Inquiry v. Marion Circuit Court Clerk that nonreligious individuals have the right to choose secular celebrants to officiate at their weddings.

In January 2015, the Center for Inquiry carried out a corporate consolidation, merging with its two affiliates, the Committee for Skeptical Inquiry and the Council for Secular Humanism.

Lindsay and Center for Inquiry founder Paul Kurtz had disagreements over the operation of the organization which drew the attention of The New York Times.

References 

Year of birth missing (living people)
Living people
American humanists
Georgetown University alumni
University of Virginia School of Law alumni
21st-century American writers
Secular humanists